Hal Draper (born Harold Dubinsky; September 19, 1914 – January 26, 1990) was an American socialist activist and author who played a significant role in the Berkeley, California, Free Speech Movement. He is known for his extensive scholarship on the history and meaning of the thought of Karl Marx.

Draper was a lifelong advocate of what he called "socialism from below", that is, self-emancipation by the working class, in opposition to capitalism and Stalinist bureaucracy. He was one of the creators of the Third Camp tradition, a form of Marxist socialism.

Biography

Early years 
Harold Dubinsky was born in Brooklyn, New York, in 1914, the son of Jewish immigrants from Ukraine, then part of the Russian Empire. His father, Samuel Dubinsky (d. 1924), was the manager of a shirt factory. His mother, Annie Kornblatt Dubinsky, ran a candy store to make ends meet following her husband's death. He was one of four children, and Theodore Draper was his brother.

When Hal was eighteen, his mother insisted upon changing the family name to the "American-sounding" name "Draper" to shield the children from anti-Semitism as they entered their careers.

Hal graduated from Boys High School and earned a bachelor's degree from Brooklyn College in 1934.

Political career 
During his teenage years he joined the Young People's Socialist League (YPSL), then the youth affiliate of the Socialist Party of America, and he became a leader of the national student movements of the day that organized against fascism, war, and unemployment.

Draper's political choices were in contrast to those made by his brother Theodore Draper, a fellow traveler of the Communist Party in the 1930s who would later be disillusioned with Communism and become a prominent historian. Their sister Dorothy (Dora) Draper would marry Jacob Rabkin (1905–2003), one of the intellectual founders of US tax law.

Within the YPSL, Hal Draper was won over to Trotskyism and became an important leader of the YPSL's Trotskyist "Appeal Tendency" during 1936 and 1937. He was elected the organization's national secretary, its top post, at its September 1937 convention, which renounced the Stalinist Third International in favor of a new Trotskyist Fourth International. The great majority of the YPSL supported that position and left or was expelled by the Socialist Party in the fall of that year. Along with his YPSL activity, Draper took part in the founding of the Socialist Workers Party in 1937–1938.

As debates erupted within the newly formed SWP, Draper aligned with those who objected to the internal regime of that party and were developing an analysis of the Soviet Union under Joseph Stalin as a new form of society, neither socialist nor capitalist, in which a new class, the state bureaucracy, held social and state power. In 1940, that faction, led by Max Shachtman, James Burnham, and Martin Abern, split from the SWP to form the Workers Party. Draper joined them in founding the new organization. During the war, he and his wife Anne Draper, the former Anne Kracik, lived in Los Angeles, where they were active among shipyard workers and in antifascist and antiracist campaigns. Returning to New York in the mid 1940s, Draper became a major writer and functionary for the Workers Party. He would often write and edit almost the entire contents of issues of the group's paper, Labor Action.

By 1948, the Workers Party came to believe that the prospects for revolution were receding and that it must adopt a more realistic strategy, given the diminished prospects. Therefore, it changed its name to the Independent Socialist League, an acknowledgement that its size and capacities did not warrant the name "party." With a shrinking membership (although its youth work was buoyant), the ISL leadership around Shachtman decided that the time had come to join forces with the Socialist Party of America, which occurred in 1958. Although Draper personally opposed the decision, he submitted to the majority. He regretted the rightward tendency of the organization, however, and in 1962, Draper, by then resident in Berkeley, California, as a part-time microfilm acquisitions librarian at the University of California, Berkeley, broke with the Socialist Party to form the Independent Socialist Club (ISC), which had a heavy youth composition. During this period, Draper received a master's degree from Berkeley in 1960.

In 1964, Draper was heavily involved in the Free Speech Movement, an important precursor of that decade's New Left, on the Berkeley campus. He was a mentor to leader Mario Savio and others. In the introduction to Draper's Berkeley: The New Student Revolt (1965), Savio acknowledges Draper's encouragement and friendship and cites the influence of Draper's pamphlet The Mind of Clark Kerr (October 1964) on the development of the Free Speech Movement.

In 1968, ISC became the International Socialists as it expanded nationally. Draper left the organization three years later, arguing that the group had become a sect. From then on, he worked as an independent radical scholar, producing a stream of scholarly works on Marxism and the workers' movement.

Death 
Draper died of pneumonia at his home in Berkeley, California, on January 26, 1990.

Legacy 
Draper's magnum opus is his five-volume Karl Marx's Theory of Revolution (Monthly Review Press, 1977–1990), a seminal re-evaluation of the whole of Marx's political theory, based on an exhaustive survey of the writings of both Marx and Engels. He saw their political perspective as summarized by the phrase "socialism from below," which he had introduced in his pamphlet The Two Souls of Socialism.

Draper was also the editor of a three-volume Marx-Engels Cyclopedia, detailing the day-to-day activities and writings of the two founders of modern socialism.

Besides his overtly political writings, Draper wrote the short story Ms Fnd in a Lbry, a satire of the information age, in 1961.

In 1982, Draper also published an English translation of the complete poetic works of the 19th-century German poet Heinrich Heine, the fruit of three decades of work conducted alongside his better-known political activity.

Associations 
During his life, he was a member of the following organizations:
 Young People's Socialist League
 Socialist Workers Party
 Workers Party
 Independent Socialist League
 Socialist Party of America
 Free Speech Movement
 Independent Socialist Club/International Socialists

He was also a member of the editorial board of New Politics.

Works 
 Out of their own mouths: a documentary study of the new line of the Comintern on war New York: Young People's Socialist League, Greater New York Federation, 1935
 Are you ready for war? New York : Young People's Socialist League, 1937
 The truth about Gerald Smith: America's no. 1 fascist San Pedro, Calif: Workers Party, Los Angeles Section, 1945
 Jim Crow in Los Angeles Los Angeles: Workers Party, 1946
 ABC of Marxism: outline text for class and self study Los Angeles: Workers Party, 1946
 Labor, key to a better world Austin, Tex: Young People's Socialist League, 1950–1959?
 The two souls of socialism: socialism from below v. socialism from above New York : Young People's Socialist League, 1963
 Joseph Weydemeyer's "Dictatorship of the proletariat". [n.p.] Labor History, 1962
 Notes on the India–China border war U.S.?: s.n., 1962
 Marx and the dictatorship of the proletariat Paris : I.S.E.A, Cahiers de l'Institut de science économique appliquée #129 Série S,; Etudes de marxologie #6 1962
 Introduction to independent socialism; selected articles from Labor action Berkeley, Independent Socialist Press 1963
 The mind of Clark Kerr. [Berkeley, Calif.] Independent Socialist Club 1964
 Independent socialism, a perspective for the left Berkeley, Calif. : Independent Socialist Committee,  1964 Independent Socialist Committee pamphlet #1
 Third camp; the independent socialist view of war and peace policy Berkeley, Calif. : Independent Socialist Committee, 1965 Independent Socialist Committee pamphlet #2
 Berkeley: the new student revolt New York : Grove Press, 1965
 "The Two Souls of Socialism," New Politics, 1966
 Strike!: the second battle of Berkeley : what happened and how can we win (with others) [Berkeley, Calif.? : s.n.,  1966 
 The fight for independence in Vietnam. Berkeley, Calif. Independent Socialist Club 1966
 Independent socialism and war; articles Berkeley, Calif. Independent Socialist Committee  1966 Independent socialist clippingbooks, #2
 Zionism, Israel, & the Arabs: the historical background of the Middle East tragedy [Berkeley, Calif. : s.n.] 1967 Independent socialist clippingbooks, #3
 The first Israel-Arab war, 1948–49 Berkeley : Independent Socialist Clippingbooks,  1967 	Independent Socialist Clippingbooks Xerocopy series #X-2
 The dirt on California; agribusiness and the University [Berkeley, Calif., Independent Socialist Clubs of America, 1968
 Karl Marx & Friedrich Engels: articles in the New American cyclopaedia. Berkeley, Calif. Independent Socialist Press 1969 Independent socialist clippingbooks, #5
 The Permanent war economy Berkeley, Calif. Independent Socialist Press 1970 Independent socialist clippingbooks, #7
 Notebook on the Paris Commune; press excerpts & notes.''' by Karl Marx Berkeley, Calif. Independent Socialist Press 1971 (editor) Independent socialist clippingbooks, #8
 Writings on the Paris Commune by Karl Marx New York Monthly Review Press 1971 (editor)
 The Politics of Ignazio Silone: a controversy around Silone's statement "My political faith" : contributions' (with Ignazio Silone, Lucio Libertini and Irving Howe) Berkeley, Calif. Independent Socialist Press 1974  Independent socialist clippingbooks, #10
 Karl Marx's theory of revolution Vol. 1 State and bureaucracy New York Monthly Review Press 1977
 Karl Marx's theory of revolution Vol. 2 The politics of social classes New York Monthly Review Press 1978
 The complete poems of Heinrich Heine: a modern English version by Heinrich Heine Boston: Suhrkamp/Insel; Oxford: Distributed by Oxford University Press 1982
 The annotated Communist manifesto Berkeley, CA: Center for Socialist History 1984
 The adventures of the Communist manifesto Berkeley, CA: Center for Socialist History 1984
 The Marx–Engels register: a complete bibliography of Marx and Engels' individual writings New York : Schocken Books, 1985
 The Marx–Engels chronicle: a day-by-day chronology of Marx and Engels' life and activity New York : Schocken Books, 1985
 The Marx–Engels cyclopedia New York : Schocken Books, 1985–1986
 Karl Marx's theory of revolution Vol. 3 The "Dictatorship of the Proletariat" New York Monthly Review Press 1986
 The "dictatorship of the proletariat" from Marx to Lenin New York Monthly Review Press 1987
 America as overlord: from Yalta to Vietnam  Berkeley, CA: Independent Socialist Press 1989 Draper papers, #1
 Karl Marx's theory of revolution Vol. 4 Critique of other socialisms New York Monthly Review Press 1990
 Socialism from below Atlantic Highlands, NJ: Humanities Press, 1992
 War and revolution: Lenin and the myth of revolutionary defeatism Atlantic Highlands, NJ: Humanities Press, 1996
 The Hidden History of the Equal Rights Amendment (co-author: Stephen F. Diamond), Center for Socialist History, Berkeley, CA, 2013.

See also 
 Socialism from below

 References 

 Sources 
 Geier, Joel. "Socialism from Below: Hal Draper's Contribution to Revolutionary Marxism," International Socialist Review, no. 107 (Winter 2017-18), pp. 87–108.
 Haberkern, Ernest. "Introduction to Hal Draper", Marxists Internet Archive, 1998
 Phelps, Christopher. "Draper, Hal," in Encyclopedia of the American Left,'' 2d ed., ed. Mari Jo Buhle et al. (Oxford University Press, 1996).
 "Hal Draper, 75, Socialist Writer Who Recounted Berkeley Protest," The New York Times, January 31, 1990

External links 
 
 Hal Draper Archive at marxists.org
 

1914 births
1990 deaths
Jewish American writers
Jewish socialists
Brooklyn College alumni
Members of the Socialist Workers Party (United States)
Members of the Workers Party (United States)
Members of the Socialist Party of America
Members of the International Socialists (United States)
American anti-capitalists
American Marxists
American political writers
American communists
American Trotskyists
American male non-fiction writers
California socialists
Marxist theorists
Marxist writers
New York (state) socialists
20th-century American non-fiction writers
Boys High School (Brooklyn) alumni
Deaths from pneumonia in California
20th-century American male writers